"Zoo" is a song recorded by South Korean girl group Red Velvet for their first special extended play (EP) The Red Summer (2017). It was written by Lee Seu-ran of Jam Factory, while the production was handled by Courtney Woolsey, Alice Penrose and production team LDN Noise. The tropical house-influenced song has since become a stand-out track and received favorably reviews from music critics, citing it as a "gleeful and audacious pop moment". Following the digital success of the parental extended play, "Zoo" achieved a peak at number 24 on Gaon Digital Chart.

Background and composition 
Following the release of Red Velvet's fourth extended play Rookie in February, SM Entertainment confirmed through news outlet on June 23, 2017, that the girls would be releasing their first summer release and had recently finished filming a music video. After revealing both the group's image and video teasers, the song was released digitally with its parent album on July 9, 2017, and physically on July 10, 2017.

"Zoo" is a tropical-influenced song which was composed in the key of C# major, with a tempo of 109 BPM. The song has been described as "playful and rhythmic", while incorporating animal sounds and member Seulgi's imitation of Tarzan's battle cry throughout the track. It also marked the first LDN Noise production work for an S.M. artist in 2017 and the second time they work with Red Velvet, after the release of the group's first studio album The Red (2015).

Reception 
The song received positive reviews from critics following its digital release, with Lee Gi-seon of IZM magazine chose the track as one of the EP's highlights. Chase McMullen of The 405 website praised the song, calling it "one of the most gleeful and audacious pop moments". Chester Chin from Star2 reacted positively to the song. citing it and follow album track "Mojito" as examples for "extend the feel-good dance floor vibe".

Due to the digital success of The Red Summer, all five tracks from the EP charted within the top forty of Gaon Digital Chart for the week from July 9 to July 15, 2017, with "Zoo" debuted and peaked at number 24 on the aforementioned chart, while additionally charted at number 12 on the Gaon Download Chart. It also debuted at number 30 on the re-established Billboard K-Pop Hot 100 for the week of July 17, and peaked at number 96 on the July issue of the monthly Gaon Digital Chart.

Live performance 
The song was first performed at Red Velvet's first concert "Red Room" in August, 2017.

Credits and personnel 
Credits adapted from the liner notes of The Red Summer.

Studio

 Recorded at doobdoob Studio
 Edited at Big Shot Studio
 Mixed at SM Yellow Tail Studio

Personnel

 Red Velvet (Irene, Seulgi, Wendy, Joy, Yeri) – vocals, background vocals
 Lee Seu-ran – Korean lyrics
 LDN Noise – original writer, arrangement
 Courtney Woolsey – original writer, background vocals
 Alice Penrose – original writer

 Kenzie – vocal director
 Ahn Chang-kyu – recording
 Lee Min-kyu – digital editing
 Koo Jong-pil (Beat Burger) – mixing

Charts

Weekly chart

Monthly chart

Release history

References 

2017 songs
Korean-language songs
Red Velvet (group) songs
SM Entertainment singles
Songs written by Hayden Chapman
Songs written by Greg Bonnick
Song recordings produced by LDN Noise